Natércia is a municipality in southern Minas Gerais State, Brazil.

References 

Municipalities in Minas Gerais